James Wells Pattison (December 18, 1908 in Bronx, New York – February 22, 1991 in Melbourne, Florida) was a pitcher in Major League Baseball. He pitched in six games for the 1929 Brooklyn Robins.

External links

1908 births
1991 deaths
Major League Baseball pitchers
Brooklyn Robins players
Baseball players from New York (state)
Macon Peaches players
Richmond Byrds players
Hartford Senators players
York White Roses players
Toronto Maple Leafs (International League) players
Montreal Royals players